Rückersdorf could be any one of the following places:

 Germany:
 Rückersdorf, Thuringia
 Rückersdorf, Bavaria,  a town in the district of Nürnberger Land in Bavaria
 Rückersdorf, Brandenburg
 Austria:
 Rückersdorf, Lower Austria
 Rückersdorf, Carinthia
 Switzerland:
 Rückersdorf, Switzerland